The Merchant Marine Medal for Outstanding Achievement is a decoration of the United States Merchant Marine awarded by the United States Maritime Administration.  It was established in 2002 and is awarded to members of the maritime industry who have made extraordinarily valuable contributions to the merchant marine.

[A]warded to recognize merchant mariners who have participated in an act or operation of humanitarian nature directly to an individual or groups of individuals. This medal may be awarded to those leaders in the maritime industry who have dedicated years of service or achievement and/or given an extraordinary valuable contribution or work to the maritime industry. This medal requires the Maritime Administrator’s approval for award.

Award Recipients
2005: John A. Yarber, Second Assistant Engineer, USNS Pililaau. Awarded in recognition for providing relief and care to the victims of Hurricanes Katrina and Rita.

2005: Edward B. McDonnell, LCDR / 3rd Mate SS Wright. Awarded in recognition for providing relief and care to the victims of Hurricanes Katrina and Rita.

2009:Vincent Lombardi, Capt/ Ferry boat Thomas Jefferson,
New York Waterway. Awarded for the rescue of 56 passengers off of flight 1549 which landed in the Hudson river on January 15, 2009.

2010:  John M. Bozzi; Third Officer-USNS 1st Lt Jack Lummus (T-AK 3011).  Awarded for the participation in OPERATION UNIFIED RESPONSE, providing relief and care to the victims of the 2010 Haiti earthquake.

2011: Operation Tomodachi USNS Bridge (T-AOE 10) Second Officer Andrew Chen.

2012: Mark A. Ricker Jr., awarded for the participation in providing relief to the victims of Superstorm Sandy

2012: Crew of the Horizon Reliance (container ship) awarded for the rescue of the crew aboard the distressed vessel Liahona during a storm off the coast of Hilo, Hawaii.

2015: William D. Eglinton.

2011: Operation Tomodachi USNS Rappahannock (T-AO 204) Able Seaman Christopher Lewis.

2012: Robert Mason, Great Lakes Maritime Academy Pilotage Instructor. In recognition of greater than 30 years as an instructor.

2014: Michael Hochscheidt, Great Lakes Maritime Academy Engineering Department Head. In recognition of greater than 30 years as an instructor.

2017: Capt. Michael Horn. In recognition of a 41-year career in the U.S. Merchant Marine, including serving as an instructor and mentor to Great Lakes Maritime Academy cadets after serving for greater than 30 years as a Merchant Marine Officer.

2017: Capt. Mark Phillips. In recognition of a 42-year career in the U.S. Merchant Marine, including serving as an instructor and mentor to Great Lakes Maritime Academy cadets after serving for greater than 30 years as a Merchant Marine Officer.

2017: Capt. Konstantinos E. Malihoutsakis,

2018: Commodore Harry J. Bolton, Jr. The Maritime Administration recognizes the distinguished service of Commodore Harry Bolton and awards him with the US Merchant Marine medal for Outstanding Achievement.  A 1978 graduate of the California Maritime Academy, Commodore Bolton was appointed as Captain USMS in May 2008 on excepting the position of Commanding Officer of the Training Ship Golden Bear and Director of Marine Programs.  Prior to joining the Golden Bear, He sailed extensively in the US Merchant Marine, serving in support of the Grenada Invasion, the First Gulf War, and Operation Iraqi Freedom.  He is the recipient of two Merchant Marine Expeditionary Medals and the US Navy Meritorious Civil Service Award, among other decorations.  Commodore Bolton is an Unlimited Master Mariner with 44 years of experience, including 33 years in command billets.  His expertise on a broad array of topics, including theater logistics and joint military operations is well known and sought after by industry and the US Armed Forces.  His accomplishments include design of the English speaking curriculum at the Maritime Academy of Asia and Pacific in the Philippines.  He was appointed to the position of Commodore in August 2018.  The wisdom and leadership of Commodore Bolton has been evident during his command of the Golden Bear.  His efforts have not only improved the capabilities of that ship for California Maritime cadets, but for other state academy cadets and USMMA midshipmen as well.  Therefore, in recognition of his lifetime of dedication to the US Merchant Marine and the American Maritime Industry, and for his many contributions and achievements in the Maritime field, I am pleased to award Commodore Harry Bolton the Merchant Marine Medal for Outstanding Achievement, our nation is grateful for his service.  Signed ADM Mark H. Buzby, Maritime Administrator  

2019:  Captain Michael Surgalski. In recognition of a 40-year career, and especially for his service as an instructor at the Great Lakes Maritime Academy and as the first Master of the Training Ship State of Michigan.

2019:  Timothy J. Nelson, President–Northwestern Michigan College.  The Great Lakes Maritime Academy is a division of Northwestern College.  Timothy Nelson served as the College President from 2000 to 2019.  During his tenure he undertook initiatives that resulted in the Academy moving from one where cadets would earn an associate degree and a license valid for service on the Great Lakes to one where all cadets received a bachelor's degree and a license valid for service on the Great Lakes and oceans.

See also
Awards and decorations of the United States government
Awards and Decorations of the United States Maritime Administration
Awards and decorations of the United States Merchant Marine
Awards and decorations of the United States military

References

External links

Award Criteria - Retrieved 30 March 2007

Awards and decorations of the United States Merchant Marine
Awards established in 2002
2002 establishments in the United States